The Jacksonville metropolitan area is the metropolitan area centered on Jacksonville, Florida.

Jacksonville metropolitan area may also refer to:

The Jacksonville, North Carolina metropolitan area, United States
The Jacksonville, Texas micropolitan area, United States
The Jacksonville, Illinois micropolitan area, United States

See also
Jacksonville (disambiguation)